Jack Evan Noseworthy Jr. (born December 21, 1964) is an American actor known for his roles in Event Horizon, U-571, Barb Wire and Killing Kennedy.

Early life
Noseworthy earned a Bachelor of Fine Arts degree from the Boston Conservatory.

Career 
He appeared in Bon Jovi's music video "Always", with Carla Gugino and Keri Russell. He co-starred with Meryl Streep in the Public Theater's 2006 production of Mother Courage and Her Children.

He starred in a short-lived MTV drama series, Dead at 21. In December 2005, he originated the role of Armand in the musical Lestat during its pre-Broadway run at the Curran Theatre in San Francisco, but left the production during its first week of previews (he was replaced by actor Drew Sarich). He is also the only male actor to play Peter Pan on Broadway, in the revue Jerome Robbins' Broadway.

In 2013, Noseworthy played Attorney General Robert F. Kennedy in Killing Kennedy, a made-for-television movie aired on National Geographic Channel.

In 2018, Noseworthy joined the Canadian production of Come from Away, in the role of Kevin T. and others.

Personal life
Noseworthy has been in a relationship with choreographer Sergio Trujillo since 1990. They married in 2011. Noseworthy and Trujillo have a son born in 2018.

Filmography

Film

Television

References

External links
 

1964 births
Age controversies
Male actors from Massachusetts
American male film actors
American male television actors
American male musical theatre actors
20th-century American male actors
21st-century American male actors
Boston Conservatory at Berklee alumni
Living people
Actors from Lynn, Massachusetts
American gay actors
LGBT people from Massachusetts